Phyllanthus millei is a species of plant in the family Phyllanthaceae. It is endemic to Ecuador.  Its natural habitat is subtropical or tropical dry forests.

References

Endemic flora of Ecuador
millei
Critically endangered plants
Taxonomy articles created by Polbot